Musikproduktion Höflich is a music publisher established by Jürgen Höflich in Munich, Germany. The firm started in 2002 by publishing reprints of miniature scores which were long out of print within the series Repertoire Explorer and Opera Explorer. Later the catalogue was expanded into various series such as The Phillip Brookes Collection, The Flemish Music Collection, and a special edition for piano solo. The catalogue includes rare scores of works from the opera and orchestra repertoire as well as chamber and vocal music.

External links 
 www.musikmph.de

Music publishing companies of Germany
Sheet music publishing companies
Publishing companies established in 2002
Mass media in Munich
2002 establishments in Germany